Chato (Spanish nickname: "flat", Chatto or Chatta, 1854 – 13 August 1934) was a Chiricahua Apache subchief who carried out several raids on settlers in Arizona in the 1870s. His Apache name was Bidayajislnl or Pedes-klinje. He was a protege of Cochise, and he surrendered with Cochise in 1872 going to live on the San Carlos Reservation in southern Arizona, where he became an Apache Scout. Following his service as a scout he was taken prisoner after being coerced to travel to Washington, D.C. Chato was imprisoned in St. Augustine, Florida along with almost 500 other Apache at Fort Marion.

Early life
Chato was a first cousin to Mangas Coloradas. He married a Chokonen Apache woman and pledged his loyalty to Cochise. He wanted to ascend to Chief of the Warm Springs Apache following the death of Victorio, but was succeeded by Nana.

Since 1876, the Chiricahua Apaches theoretically lived at the San Carlos Reservation in southeastern Arizona, where supplies were inadequate, diseases rife, and politics corrupt. Many escaped to the Sierra Madre Mountains of northern Mexico, where they supported themselves by raiding and plundering on both sides of the border.

After the arrest of Noch-del-klinne and the rebellion of the Apache scouts, Chato slipped away from the reservation with other Apache such as Juh, Naiche, and Geronimo, who feared for their lives.

The McComas massacre was the name given to an incident which occurred in southwestern New Mexico Territory on the afternoon of March 28, 1883. Former Union soldier and a prior judge, Hamilton C. McComas, his wife Juanita and six-year-old son Charlie were attacked by a Chiricahua war party led by Chato while on the road between Silver City and Lordsburg, New Mexico. McComas died of gunshot wounds and his wife was killed by a blow to the head. The fate of Charlie was never ascertained as there were a variety of conflicting reports. The incident made national headlines at the time.

Army scout
General George Crook and 250 men attacked Chato's ranchera in June 1883, so Chato surrendered with Geronimo and others to General Crook. Chato then served under General Crook as a scout, including the subsequent expedition into the Sierra Madre after Geronimo in 1886.

Upon his return to Arizona, Chato led a peace delegation to Washington where he was presented with a silver medal by President Grover Cleveland. On his way back, at Fort Leavenworth he was arrested and deported to Fort Marion in Florida, then to Fort Pickens in Florida, then moved to Mount Vernon, Alabama.

In 1894 Chato and his family were allowed to move to Fort Sill, in Oklahoma, and in 1913 Chato and his family opted to go out to the Mescalero Reservation in New Mexico.

On August 13, 1934 Chato's Ford Model T went off the road outside Whitetail, New Mexico, on the Mescalero Apache Reservation; he died at the scene.

Popular culture

In 1966, John Hoyt starred as a fictional Chato (the name was slightly altered to "Chata") in the American Western film Duel at Diablo.

Woody Strode played a fictional Chato in the 1968 British Western Shalako, with Sean Connery and Brigitte Bardot, filmed in Almería, Spain.

In 1970, Ricardo Montalbán guest starred as a fictional Chato on the American television program Gunsmoke.

Steve Reevis played Chato in the movie Geronimo: An American Legend starring Wes Studi, Jason Patrick, Gene Hackman, Robert Duval, and Matt Damon.

Chato was also played by Charles Bronson in Chato's Land.

References

External links

 
 

1854 births
1934 deaths
Chiricahua people
Native American leaders
Native American people of the Indian Wars
People of pre-statehood Arizona
People from New Mexico
People of the American Old West
Apache Wars
Native Americans imprisoned at Fort Marion
United States Army Indian Scouts
Native American history of Arizona
Native American history of New Mexico